Mosquito hawk can mean:

Chuck-will's-widow
Crane fly 
Damselfly
Dragonfly
A type of fishing fly

Animal common name disambiguation pages